Frank Stewart (11 August 1910 – 4 September 1986) was an  Australian rules footballer who played with Hawthorn in the Victorian Football League (VFL).

Notes

External links 

1910 births
1986 deaths
Australian rules footballers from Victoria (Australia)
Hawthorn Football Club players